Mikel Kevon Thomas (born 23 November 1987 in Maloney) is a Trinidad and Tobago hurdler. He competed in the 110 m hurdles event at the 2008, 2012 and 2016 Summer Olympics.

In January 2021, Mikel Thomas tells his story. Mother hands him the flag at the medal ceremony for his first international medal at 2015 Pan Am Games. Mikel Thomas cried because in 2014, the Olympian, Thomas was homeless.

Outside of sport, coach Thomas became a firefighter.

Personal bests

Outdoor
100 m: 10.24 s (wind: +1.1 m/s) –  Port of Spain, 27 June 2015
110 m hurdles: 13.17 s (wind: +0.8 m/s) –  Toronto, 24 July 2015
400 m hurdles: 51.40 s –  Port of Spain, 22 June 2008

Indoor
60 m: 6.67 s –  Albuquerque, 23 January 2016
60 m hurdles: 7.67 s –  Lincoln, Nebraska, 6 February 2010

International competitions

1: Disqualified in the final.

References

External links

Tilastopaja biography

Sportspeople from Port of Spain
Trinidad and Tobago male hurdlers
1987 births
Living people
Olympic athletes of Trinidad and Tobago
Athletes (track and field) at the 2008 Summer Olympics
Athletes (track and field) at the 2012 Summer Olympics
Athletes (track and field) at the 2016 Summer Olympics
Athletes (track and field) at the 2014 Commonwealth Games
Athletes (track and field) at the 2007 Pan American Games
Athletes (track and field) at the 2015 Pan American Games
Commonwealth Games competitors for Trinidad and Tobago
World Athletics Championships athletes for Trinidad and Tobago
Pan American Games silver medalists for Trinidad and Tobago
Pan American Games medalists in athletics (track and field)
Medalists at the 2015 Pan American Games